Euthlastoblatta is a genus of cockroach in the family Ectobiidae. There are about nine described species in Euthlastoblatta.

Species
These nine species belong to the genus Euthlastoblatta:
 Euthlastoblatta abortiva (Caudell, 1904) (fragile cockroach)
 Euthlastoblatta beckeri Lopes & Oliveira, 2005
 Euthlastoblatta compsa Hebard, 1920
 Euthlastoblatta diaphana (Fabricius, 1793)
 Euthlastoblatta facies (Walker, 1868)
 Euthlastoblatta grata Hebard, 1922
 Euthlastoblatta moralesi Princis, 1965
 Euthlastoblatta orizabae (Saussure, 1868)
 Euthlastoblatta subpectinata (Saussure & Zehntner, 1893)

References

Further reading

 

Cockroaches
Articles created by Qbugbot